Alliance is a village in Suriname, located on banks of the Suriname River in the district Commewijne.

History 
This used to be a plantation.
In 1936 - 1956 the manager used to be G.N. Gummels.

Geography 
It is located on the right side of the Suriname River

Economy 
The economy is completely dependent on agriculture, mostly citrus. These then get sold in Paramaribo.

Transport 
One takes a boat at Alkmaar

References

Populated places in Commewijne District